Grainger may refer to:

Places
Grainger, Alberta, a locality in Canada
Grainger County, Tennessee, a county located in Tennessee, United States
Grainger Falls, a waterfall in Chalky Inland, Fiordland, New Zealand
Grainger Market, a covered market in Newcastle upon Tyne, England
Grainger Stadium, a sports venue in Kinston, North Carolina, United States
Grainger Town, a historic centre of Newcastle upon Tyne, England
Grainger Generating Station, a former coal-fired power plant located in Conway, South Carolina

People
 Grainger (surname)

Companies
 Grainger Games, a British video game retailer
 Grainger Industrial Supply or W.W. Grainger, a Fortune 500 industrial supply company
 Grainger plc, a British residential property company

Other
 Grainger challenge, a scientific competition to find an economical way to remove arsenic from arsenic-contaminated groundwater